The Ormes Stadium is an athletics stadium located at Lomme, France along the street Lompret and seats 1500 people.

References

Athletics (track and field) venues in France
Rugby union stadiums in France
Sports venues completed in 2004
Sports venues in Nord (French department)
21st-century architecture in France